Aluminium Industrie Vaassen BV v Romalpa Aluminium Ltd [1976] 1 WLR 676 is a landmark UK insolvency law case, concerning a quasi-security interest in a company's assets and priority of creditors in a company winding up.

Facts
Aluminium Industrie Vaasen BV was a Dutch supplier of aluminium foil. Romalpa Aluminium Ltd processed it in their factory. In the contract of sale, it said that ownership of the foil would only be transferred to Romalpa when the purchase price had been paid in full and products made from the foil should be kept by the buyers as bailees (the contract referring to the Dutch expression ‘fiduciary owners’) separately from other stock on AIV’s behalf as ‘surety’ for the rest of the price. But it also said Romalpa had the power to sell the manufactured articles in the course of business. When such sales took place, this would be deemed to be as an agent for AIV. Romalpa went insolvent, and the receiver and manager of Romalpa's bank, Hume Corporation Ltd, wanted the aluminium to be caught by its floating charge. AlV contended that its contract was effective to retain title to the goods, and so it did not need to share them with other creditors in the liquidation.

Judgment

High Court
Mocatta J held the retention of title clause was effective. Aluminium Industrie Vaasen was still the owner of the aluminium foil, and could trace the price due to them into the proceeds of sale of the finished goods, ahead of Romalpa’s unsecured and secured creditors. He said the following.

Court of Appeal
Roskill LJ, Goff LJ and Megaw LJ upheld the decision, and that Aluminium Industrie Vaassen retained title to the unused aluminium foil.

Influence 
In the commercial law of Commonwealth countries including Australia, clauses in contracts of purchase and sale providing that the seller retains title in the goods sold until the seller receives payment in full from the buyer are known as Romalpa clauses. In Canada and the United States, these contracts are sometimes called conditional sale agreements.

See also

Romalpa clause
UK insolvency law

References

Further reading
 
 L Sealy and S Worthington, Cases and Materials in Company Law (8th edn OUP 2008) 495-496

English contract case law
United Kingdom company case law
United Kingdom insolvency case law
Court of Appeal (England and Wales) cases
1976 in case law
1976 in British law